Sudatel is a telecommunications and Internet service provider in Sudan.  The company is responsible for the construction and maintenance of Sudan's telecom infrastructure.  Sudatel is more than 60% owned by the Sudanese government; the remainder being owned by private interests.  Its stock is listed on the Bahrain Stock Exchange.

The company is active in the development of the Al Zariba / North Kurdufan area.

Related organizations
Sudatel owns stock in the following companies:
Arab Cables - 40% owned by Sudatel
Thurya Mobile Phone Service 
Rascom
Sudanet - 51% (sometime between 2005 and 2007, Sudatel acquired a 100% share in Sudanet)
Datanet(Sudan) - 99% 
Bank Service
Hawatif Corporation
Expresso Telecom
Sudani

Operations
Sudatel is expanding its satellite earthlink facilities and building a fiber optic network.  Sudatel's fiber projects include:
Sudan - Egypt Fiber Line - 350 km;
Sudan - Ethiopia Landline Project; 
Sea Cable Project - the fiber cable project to link Port Sudan with Jeddah, Saudi Arabia, under the Red Sea.  This US$20 mm project commenced construction in May 2003.  It is being accomplished in conjunction with British Telecommunications and the French firm Alcatel; as of December 2006, Sudatel's website reports that "Sudatel is linked to the Kingdom of Saudi Arabia via a network of sea cables"; 
Distance Learning Project - connecting universities with remote towns and villages using a dedicated HDSL system. 
Sudatel paid $100 million to be licensed as Mauritania's third mobile phone service provider.
Sudatel signed a contract to establish and operate the East Africa continental sea cable, which shall link South Africa’s telecom network with that of Sudatel, which cable shall run from Port Sudan to the Cape of Good Hope; the project is being done in association with Alcatel and has a budget of US$250 million.

References

External links
 Sudatel
 Expresso Telecom

Companies based in Khartoum
Telecommunications companies of Sudan